Dehydroglycine is the organic compound with the formula .  This rarely observed species is invoked as the product of oxidation (dehydrogenation) of glycine by glycine oxidase (ThiO), which is a step in the biosynthesis of thiamin.  It is also invoked as a product of the radical SAM-induced fragmentation of tyrosine.  It is an imino acid.

References 

Carboxylic acids
Imines